This is a list of islands in Macaronesia, as ordered by area, max altitude and population.

Islands over

Islands under

References

Macaronesia
Macaronesia